The RAND Corporation (from the phrase "research and development") is a non-partisan American nonprofit global policy think tank and research institute that conducts research in multiple fields and industries including national security, education, public health, energy, the environment, economics, political science and international relations, infrastructure, law and criminology (criminal justice), anthropology, sociology, social policy, the social sciences, natural sciences, technology, engineering, mathematics, and their application on public policy, public administration, and business administration issues.

It is largely financed by the U.S. government, private endowments, corporations, universities, charitable foundations, U.S. state and local governments, private individuals, international organizations, and in small part by foreign governments.

The RAND Corporation was originally founded in 1948 by Douglas Aircraft Company (predecessor of Boeing) to offer research and analysis to the United States Armed Forces. Today, it has diversified its fields of research beyond the defense industry and aerospace manufacturing, now entering into more civilian-serving areas such as "Education and the Arts;" "Health and Health Care;" "International Affairs;" "Energy, Environment, and Economic Development;" and "Military, Veterans, and Their Families".

The company assists other governments, international organizations, private companies and foundations with a host of defense and civilian-serving non-defense issues, including healthcare and education. RAND aims for interdisciplinary and quantitative problem solving by translating theoretical concepts from formal economics and the physical sciences into novel applications in other areas, using applied science, operations research, and policy analysis.

Overview

RAND has approximately 1,850 employees. Its American locations include: Santa Monica, California (headquarters); Arlington, Virginia; Pittsburgh, Pennsylvania; and Boston, Massachusetts. The RAND Gulf States Policy Institute has an office in New Orleans, Louisiana. RAND Europe is located in Cambridge, United Kingdom, and Brussels, Belgium. RAND Australia is located in Canberra, Australia.

RAND is home to the Frederick S. Pardee RAND Graduate School, one of eight original graduate programs in public policy and the first to offer a PhD. The program aims to provide practical experience for its students, who work with RAND analysts on real-world problems. The campus is at RAND's Santa Monica research facility. The Pardee RAND School is the world's largest PhD-granting program in policy analysis.

Unlike many other universities, all Pardee RAND Graduate School students receive fellowships to cover their education costs. This allows them to dedicate their time to engage in research projects and provides them on-the-job training. RAND also offers a number of internship and fellowship programs allowing students and outsiders to assist in conducting research for RAND projects. Most of these projects are short-term and are worked on independently with the mentoring of a RAND staff member.

RAND publishes the RAND Journal of Economics, a peer-reviewed journal of economics.

Thirty-two recipients of the Nobel Prize, primarily in the fields of economics and physics, have been associated with RAND at some point in their career.

History

Project RAND
RAND was created after individuals in the War Department, the Office of Scientific Research and Development, and industry began to discuss the need for a private organization to connect operational research with research and development decisions. The immediate impetus for the creation of RAND was a fateful conversation in September 1945 between General Henry H. "Hap" Arnold and Douglas executive Franklin R. Collbohm. Both men were deeply worried that ongoing demobilization meant the federal government was about to lose direct control of the vast amount of American scientific brainpower assembled to fight World War II.

As soon as Arnold realized Collbohm had been thinking along similar lines, he said, "I know just what you're going to tell me. It's the most important thing we can do." With Arnold's blessing, Collbohm quickly pulled in additional people from Douglas to help, and together with Donald Douglas, they convened with Arnold two days later at Hamilton Army Airfield to sketch out a general outline for Collbohm's proposed project.

Douglas engineer Arthur Emmons Raymond came up with the name Project RAND, from "research and development". Collbohm suggested that he himself should serve as the project's first director, which he thought would be a temporary position while he searched for a permanent replacement for himself. He later became RAND's first president and served in that capacity until his retirement in 1967.

On 1 October 1945, Project RAND was set up under special contract to the Douglas Aircraft Company and began operations in December 1945. In May 1946, the Preliminary Design of an Experimental World-Circling Spaceship was released.

RAND Corporation
By late 1947, Douglas had expressed their concerns that their close relationship with RAND might create conflict of interest problems on future hardware contracts. In February 1948, the chief of staff of the newly created United States Air Force approved the evolution of Project RAND into a nonprofit corporation, independent of Douglas.

On 14 May 1948, RAND was incorporated as a nonprofit corporation under the laws of the State of California and on 1 November 1948, the Project RAND contract was formally transferred from the Douglas Aircraft Company to the RAND Corporation. Initial capital for the spin-off was provided by the Ford Foundation.

Since the 1950s, RAND research has helped inform United States policy decisions on a wide variety of issues, including the space race, the U.S.-Soviet nuclear arms confrontation, the creation of the Great Society social welfare programs, the digital revolution, and national health care.

Its most visible contribution may be the doctrine of nuclear deterrence by mutually assured destruction (MAD), developed under the guidance of then-Defense Secretary Robert McNamara and based upon their work with game theory. Chief strategist Herman Kahn also posited the idea of a "winnable" nuclear exchange in his 1960 book On Thermonuclear War. This led to Kahn being one of the models for the titular character of the film Dr. Strangelove, in which RAND is spoofed as the "BLAND Corporation".

Even in the late 1940s and early 1950s, long before Sputnik, the RAND project was secretly recommending to the US government a major effort to design a man-made satellite that would take photographs from space—and the rockets to put such a satellite in orbit.

Mission
RAND was incorporated as a non-profit organization to "further promote scientific, educational, and charitable purposes, all for the public welfare and security of the United States of America". Its self-declared mission is "to help improve policy and decision making through research and analysis", using its "core values of quality and objectivity".

Achievements

The achievements of RAND stem from its development of systems analysis. Important contributions are claimed in space systems and the United States' space program, in computing and in artificial intelligence. RAND researchers developed many of the principles that were used to build the Internet. RAND also contributed to the development and use of wargaming.

Current areas of expertise include: child policy, law, civil and criminal justice, education, health (public health and health care), international policy/foreign policy, labor markets, national security, defense policy, infrastructure, energy, environment, business and corporate governance, economic development, intelligence policy, long-range planning, crisis management and emergency management-disaster preparation, population studies, regional studies, comparative studies, science and technology, social policy, welfare, terrorism and counterterrorism, cultural policy, arts policy, and transportation.

RAND designed and conducted one of the largest and most important studies of health insurance between 1974 and 1982. The RAND Health Insurance Experiment, funded by the then–U.S. Department of Health, Education and Welfare, established an insurance corporation to compare demand for health services with their cost to the patient.

In 2018, RAND began its Gun Policy in America initiative, which resulted in comprehensive reviews of the evidence of the effects of gun policies in the United States. The second expanded review in 2020 analyzed almost 13,000 relevant studies on guns and gun violence since 1995 and selected 123 as having sufficient methodological rigor for inclusion. These were used to determine the level of scientific support for eighteen classes of gun policy.

Controversy
Almost since its inception, the RAND Corporation has been involved in controversial issues—and its reports, recommendations and influence have been the subject of extensive public debate and controversy. Among these have been:

 Cold War and potential nuclear conflict
 City government
 Vietnam War
 Transparency in government
 National health insurance
 Alcoholism
 Auto insurance
 Iraq War
 Gun control

Notable participants

 Henry H. "Hap" Arnold: General of the Air Force, United States Air Force
 Kenneth Arrow: economist, won the Nobel Prize in Economics, developed the impossibility theorem in social choice theory
 Bruno Augenstein: V.P., physicist, mathematician and space scientist
 Robert Aumann: mathematician, game theorist, won the Nobel Prize in Economics.
 J. Paul Austin: Chairman of the Board, 1972–1981
 Paul Baran: one of the developers of packet switching which was used in ARPANET and later networks like the Internet
 Richard Bellman: Mathematician known for his work on dynamic programming
Yoram Ben-Porat: economist and President of the Hebrew University of Jerusalem
 Barry Boehm: worked in interactive computer graphics with the RAND Corporation in the 1960s and had helped define the ARPANET in the early phases of that program
 Harold L. Brode: physicist, leading nuclear weapons effects expert
 Bernard Brodie: Military strategist and nuclear architect
 Samuel Cohen: inventor of the neutron bomb in 1958
 Franklin R. Collbohm: Aviation engineer, Douglas Aircraft Company, RAND founder and former director and trustee.
 Walter Cunningham: astronaut
 George Dantzig: mathematician, creator of the simplex algorithm for linear programming
 Linda Darling-Hammond: educational researcher, co-director, School Redesign Network
 Merton Davies: mathematician, pioneering planetary scientist
 Michael H. Decker: Senior International Defense Research Analyst 
 James F. Digby: American military strategist, author of first treatise on precision guided munitions 1949–2007
 Stephen H. Dole: Author of the book Habitable Planets for Man and head of Rand's Human Engineering Group
 Donald Wills Douglas, Sr.: President, Douglas Aircraft Company, RAND founder
 Hubert Dreyfus: philosopher and critic of artificial intelligence
 Karen Elliott House: Chairman of the Board, 2009–present, former publisher, The Wall Street Journal; Former Senior Vice President, Dow Jones & Company, Inc.
 Daniel Ellsberg: economist and leaker of the Pentagon Papers
 Alain Enthoven: economist, Deputy Assistant Secretary of Defense from 1961 to 1965, Assistant Secretary of Defense for Systems Analysis from 1965-1969
Stephen J. Flanagan, political scientist, National Security Council senior director
 Francis Fukuyama: academic and author of The End of History and the Last Man
 Horace Rowan Gaither: Chairman of the Board, 1949–1959, 1960–1961; known for the Gaither Report.
 David Galula, French officer and scholar
 James J. Gillogly: cryptographer and computer scientist
 Paul Y. Hammond: political scientist and national security scholar, affiliated 1964–79, program director 1973–76
 Anthony C. Hearn: developed the REDUCE computer algebra system, the oldest such system still in active use; co-founded the CSNET computer network
 Andrew R. Hoehn, Senior Vice President, Research and Analysis
 Fred Iklé: US nuclear policy researcher
 Brian Michael Jenkins: terrorism expert, Senior Advisor to the President of the RAND Corporation, and author of Unconquerable Nation
 Herman Kahn: theorist on nuclear war and one of the founders of scenario planning
 Amrom Harry Katz
 Konrad Kellen: research analyst and author, co-wrote open letter to U.S. government in 1969 recommending withdrawal from Vietnam war
 Zalmay Khalilzad: U.S. ambassador to United Nations
 Henry Kissinger: United States Secretary of State (1973–1977); National Security Advisor (1969–1975); Nobel Peace Prize Winner (1973)
 Ann McLaughlin Korologos: Chairman of the Board, April 2004 – 2009; Chairman Emeritus, The Aspen Institute
 Lewis "Scooter" Libby: United States Vice-President Dick Cheney's former Chief of Staff
 Ray Mabus: Former ambassador, governor
 Harry Markowitz: economist, greatly advanced financial portfolio theory by devising mean variance analysis, Nobel Prize in Economics
 Andrew W. Marshall: military strategist, director of the U.S. DoD Office of Net Assessment
 Jason Gaverick Matheny: selected as President and CEO of The RAND Corporation in 2022
 Margaret Mead: U.S. anthropologist
 Douglas Merrill: former Google CIO & President of EMI's digital music division
 Newton N. Minow: Chairman of the board, 1970–1972
 John Milnor: mathematician, known for his work in differential topology 
 Chuck Missler: Bible Teacher, Engineer, Chairman and CEO Western Digital
 Lloyd Morrisett: Chairman of the board, 1986–1995
 John Forbes Nash, Jr.: mathematician, won the Nobel Prize in Economics
 John von Neumann: mathematician, pioneer of the modern digital computer
 Allen Newell: artificial intelligence
 Paul O'Neill: Chairman of the board, 1997–2000
 Edmund Phelps: winner of the 2006 Nobel Prize in Economics
 Arthur E. Raymond: Chief engineer, Douglas Aircraft Company, RAND founder
 Condoleezza Rice: former intern, former trustee (1991–1997), and former Secretary of State for the United States
 Michael D. Rich: RAND President and Chief Executive Officer, 1 November 2011–present
 Leo Rosten: academic and humorist, helped set up the social sciences division of RAND
 Donald Rumsfeld: Chairman of board from 1981 to 1986; 1995–1996 and secretary of defense for the United States from 1975 to 1977 and 2001 to 2006.
 Robert M. Salter: advocate of the vactrain maglev train concept
 Paul Samuelson: economist, Nobel Prize in Economics
 Thomas C. Schelling: economist, won the 2005 Nobel Prize in Economics
 James Schlesinger: former secretary of defense and former secretary of energy
 Dov Seidman: lawyer, businessman and CEO of LRN
 Norman Shapiro: mathematician, co-author of the Rice–Shapiro theorem, MH Email and RAND-Abel co-designer
 Lloyd Shapley: mathematician and game theorist, won the Nobel Prize in Economics
 Cliff Shaw: inventor of the linked list and co-author of the first artificial intelligence program
 Abram Shulsky: former Director of the Pentagon's Office of Special Plans
 Herbert Simon: Political scientist, psychologist, won the 1978 Nobel Prize in Economics
 James Steinberg: Deputy National Security Advisor to Bill Clinton
 Ratan Tata: Chairman Emeritus of Tata Sons
 James Thomson: RAND president and CEO, 1989 – 31 October 2011
 Willis Ware: JOHNNIAC co-designer, and early computer privacy pioneer
 William H. Webster: Chairman of the Board, 1959–1960
 Oliver Williamson: economist, won the 2009 Nobel Prize in Economics
 Albert Wohlstetter: mathematician and Cold War strategist
 Roberta Wohlstetter: policy analyst and military historian

See also
 A Million Random Digits with 100,000 Normal Deviates (published by RAND)
 Truth Decay (also published by RAND)

References

Further reading

Books
 Alex Abella. Soldiers of Reason: The RAND Corporation and the Rise of the American Empire (2008, Houghton Mifflin Harcourt hardcover;  / 2009, Mariner Books paperback reprint edition).
 S.M. Amadae. Rationalizing Capitalist Democracy: The Cold War Origins of Rational Choice Liberalism (2003, University of Chicago Press paperback;  / hardcover).
 Martin J. Collins. Cold War Laboratory: RAND, the Air Force, and the American State, 1945–1950 (2002, Smithsonian Institution Scholarly Press hardcover, part of the Smithsonian History of Aviation and Spaceflight Series)
 Joe Flood. The Fires: How a Computer Formula Burned Down New York City—and Determined the Future of American Cities, 2010, Riverhead Books, —summarized at: GoodReads.com, and reviewed at: GoodReads.com (by Rob Kitchin), and at Accounts, (newsletter of the Economics section of the American Sociological Association), Vol. XV, Issue 2, Spring 2016, page 32.
 Sharon Ghamari-Tabrizi. The Worlds of Herman Kahn: The Intuitive Science of Thermonuclear War (2005, Harvard University Press)
 Agatha C. Hughes and Thomas P. Hughes (editors). Systems, Experts, and Computers: The Systems Approach in Management and Engineering, World War II and After (2000, The MIT Press hardcover, part of the Dibner Institute Studies in the History of Science and Technology;  / 2011, paperback reprint edition).
 David Jardini. Thinking Through the Cold War: RAND, National Security and Domestic Policy, 1945–1975 (2013, Smashwords; Amazon Kindle).
 Fred Kaplan. The Wizards of Armageddon (1983, Simon & Schuster hardcover, first printing;  / 1991, Stanford University Press paperback, part of the Stanford Nuclear Age Series).
 Edward S. Quade and Wayne I. Boucher (editors), Systems Analysis and Policy Planning: Applications in Defense (1968, American Elsevier hardcover).
 Bruce L.R. Smith. The RAND Corporation: Case Study of a Nonprofit Advisory Corporation (1966, Harvard University Press / 1969).
 Marc Trachtenberg. History and Strategy (1991, Princeton University Press paperback;  / hardcover).
 Jean Loup Samaan. La Rand Corporation (2013, Cestudec Press)

Articles
 Clifford, Peggy, ed. "RAND and The City". Santa Monica Mirror, 27 October 1999 – 2 November 1999. Five-part series includes:   
 Miller, Arthur Selwyn, reviewer, book review: "Smith: The Rand Corporation: Case Study of a Nonprofit Advisory," June 1966, Florida Law Review, Volume 19, Issue 1, Article 15.
 Specht, R.D. "Rand: A Personal View of Its History," Operations Research, vol. 8, no. 6 (Nov.–Dec. 1960), pp. 825–839. In JSTOR

Documentary films and broadcast programs
The RAND Corporation: A Brilliant Madness, historical documentary, American Experience series, PBS-TV—also detailed at "A Brilliant Madness."
"The RAND Corporation," (program listings), PBS News Hour, PBS-TV
"Daniel Ellsberg: Willing to Risk Prosecution," POV series, PBS-TV - (also trailer)

External links

 Official website
 
 The Research and Development (RAND) Corporation from the Smithsonian Institution Archives

 
Think tanks established in 1948
Federally Funded Research and Development Centers
Political and economic think tanks in the United States
Companies based in Santa Monica, California
Science and technology think tanks
Non-profit organizations based in California
Human overpopulation think tanks
Population research organizations
1948 establishments in California
Foreign policy and strategy think tanks in the United States
Think tanks based in the United States